The Haoji Railway, fully known as Kholbolji/Haolebaoji to Ji'an railway, formerly known as Menghua Railway (West Inner Mongolia to Central China), is a  freight-dedicated railway in China. It runs from Haolebaoji South railway station in Uxin Banner, Ordos City, Inner Mongolia to Ji'an railway station in Ji'an City, Jiangxi.

It was built to facilitate coal transport from Inner Mongolia and Shanxi to China's southern provinces at up to 200 million tons a year. The railway is also the first north-south railway in China that is dedicated to coal, and is built to bypass existing coal transport routes that go via coastal cities by ship. The line will reduce transit time from 20 days by sea to just 3 days. The line connects to existing railways at several points to share maintenance facilities.

The line was approved in 2014 at a cost of US$27.2 billion, financed by China Railway and several large domestic coal mining companies. The railway was inaugurated on 28 September 2019.

Major engineering works
 Sanmenxia Bridge, a double-level road-rail bridge over the Yellow River at Sanmenxia.
 Dongting Lake Bridge, cable-stayed bridge over Dongting Lake.

Operating speed
For Jinzhou-Yueyang section only the designated speed is 200km/h rather than 120km/h, although presently not implemented.

See also

Rail transport in the People's Republic of China
List of railways in China

References

External links
 Haoji Railway on Openstreetmap

Railway lines in China
Rail transport in Inner Mongolia
Rail transport in Shaanxi
Rail transport in Shanxi
Rail transport in Henan
Rail transport in Hubei
Rail transport in Hunan
Rail transport in Jiangxi
Railway lines opened in 2019